Fontbonne Hall is an all-girls, private, Roman Catholic high school in Brooklyn, New York. It was established in 1937 by the Sisters of St. Joseph,
 and is located within the Roman Catholic Diocese of Brooklyn.

In 2013, in celebration of its 75th year, school leadership noted that throughout its history, Fontbonne had educated nearly 10,000 women who “have become noted doctors, lawyers, engineers, leaders in business and the arts, educators, mothers and even, like Sister Ita Ford, class of 1957, martyrs for their cause.”

Making reference to the boroughs of New York City, Fontbonne's students predominantly come from southwest Brooklyn, southern Queens and Staten Island.

Notable alumni
 Maria Bartiromo, television financial journalist
 Kerry Butler, Broadway and TV actress
 Sister Ita Ford, M.M., missionary

Leadership

Principal Mary Ann Spicijaric and Assistant Principal Lauriann Wierzbowski are the first lay women leading the school. The leadership team aims to incorporate a STEM curriculum into FHA's academic life, including participation in science research programs, the addition of science Advanced Placement Courses and increased use of technology to meet the demands of Common Core State Standards.

Former principals include Sister Dolores Crepeau and Sister Ann Clancy.

Curriculum
Students may earn a Fontbonne Hall Regents Diploma or Fontbonne Hall Advanced Regents Diploma, which requires eight NYS Regents Exams in English, history, mathematics, science and language.

In recent years, the curriculum was expanded to include courses, such as Forensic Science, Child Development, American Sign Language, and Accounting and Law.

College Prep

The school offers various Advanced Placement courses, including English Language, English Literature, U.S. History, Calculus, Statistics, Biology, Italian and Spanish. Eligible students can also participate in the St. John’s University College Advantage Program (CAP) to earn college credits. CAP courses include English 12, Religious Studies 12, Italian 4, Spanish 4, Pre-Calculus, Calculus, and Anatomy and Physiology.

Fontbonne provides ongoing guidance and resources during the college application process. Through its Guidance Office, Fontbonne works with senior year students to plan, track and submit all college applications.  Also, colleges and universities visit the high school to meet prospective students.

The school encourages students to pursue academic and career interests, as well as self-improvement and community engagement over summers. Students enroll in leadership and pre-college programs at Boston University, Columbia University, Cornell University, Fordham University, Georgetown University, Long Island University, New York University, Stony Brook University and Vassar College.

Fontbonne students also frequently have opportunities to explore career options. At its Career Fair, students can discuss career paths with FHA alumnae, including professionals from JP Morgan Chase, Goldman Sachs, NBC Universal, Citigroup, NYC Department of Education and the DEA.

STEM Programs

Fontbonne continues its tradition of an all-girls education, which is associated with female graduates who are more academically and politically engaged than their female counterparts in coeducational private schools, with a higher likelihood of assuming leadership positions and pursuing careers in male-dominated STEM fields.

Fontbonne students participate in the ACE mentor and Manhattan College engineering programs.

Fontbonne students also recently started participating in a STEM Workshop at CUNY Graduate Center and Techweek NYC.

The school is collaborating with St. Francis College and NYU Polytechnic School of Engineering to provide more learning opportunities for students interested in the STEM fields.

Spiritual life

Fontbonne’s culture is strongly tied to its Catholic tradition. At school Masses, students and faculty sing the hymn, “The Servant Song,” to express a spirit of service to other members of the Fontbonne family and to the larger community.

Four years of Religious Studies are required, beginning with the Sacred Scriptures in freshman year and ending with a course in Loving Relationships in senior year. Fontbonne students have a day retreat for three years and an overnight retreat in their last year.

School Masses are held for major holidays, including Easter, Thanksgiving and Christmas, as well as to celebrate Catholic feast days, such as the Feast of St. Joseph.  Monsignor Robert Romano is Fontbonne’s chaplain and pastor of Our Lady of Guadalupe parish in Dyker Heights, Brooklyn.

Culture

Fontbonne maintains the small school environment through competitive enrollment and small class size. Maximum enrollment for each of the four years is about 120 young women. Students are assigned to a faculty advisor or FA and the homeroom led by the FA for four years. The faculty advisor develops a relationship with each student and works to actively discuss the student’s problems, achievements, interests and goals.

Fontbonne welcomes prospective students to an annual fall Open House and to visit the school during visit days in the 7th and 8th grade”

Sports
Fontbonne offers a wide variety of sports. The school is known for its outstanding basketball, softball, volleyball, and soccer teams who have been champions in their divisions for the last four years. Fontbonne also has a competitive cheerleading team. Four out of 10 students are on athletic teams that compete on the local and state levels.

The first Fontbonne student was named to the All-New York City girls' volleyball team selection by MSG Varsity in 2013.

References
 Notes

External links
 School Website

Educational institutions established in 1937
Girls' schools in New York City
Roman Catholic Diocese of Brooklyn
Bay Ridge, Brooklyn
Sisters of Saint Joseph schools
Roman Catholic high schools in Brooklyn
1937 establishments in New York City